Kevin Sangsamanan (born 20 May 1997) is a Thai footballer.

Career
After failing to make a league appearance for Swedish fifth division side Vallentuna BK, Sangsamanan signed for Buriram United, one of the most successful Thai teams, where he again failed to make an appearance.

In 2019, he was loaned from Buriram United to fellow Thai top club, Chiang Mai, making 1 league appearance there substituting for the goalkeeper Narit Taweekul who broke his right middle finger 15 minutes into a game.

Sangsamanan is of French, Swedish and Thai heritage.

References

External links
 Kevin Sangsamanan at Soccerway

Living people
1997 births
Association football goalkeepers
Swedish footballers
Kevin Sangsamanan
Kevin Sangsamanan
Kevin Sangsamanan
Kevin Sangsamanan